Winona Branch Sawyer (August 8, 1847 – October 24, 1939) was an American writer. She spoke widely about feminism.

Early and personal life
Sawyer was born on August 8, 1847, in Williamsville, New York to Rev. Wm. Branch and Elizabeth Trowbridge Branch. Her mother passed away when she was three years old, and since then she had travelled frequently with his father who was a Baptist missionary. His father initiated the establishment of many churches in New York, Wisconsin, Illinois, Indiana and Pennsylvania.

Sawyer was a close, lifelong friend of former colleague Frances Shimer. In 1875, she married lawyer A.J Sawyer and moved to Nebraska.

Education and career
Sawyer attended Mount Carroll Seminary, which is now known as Shimer College, and graduated in 1871. She worked as a teacher at the institution and later became a member of the board of trustees. She donated the Sawyer House, which became the official residence of the campus president.

In 1883, she enrolled at the University of Nebraska to study painting and art history.

She later studied law and became the second woman to be admitted to the Nebraska bar in 1887. In 1889, she was admitted to the Supreme Court. Sawyer adopted and looked after two male siblings and was therefore unable to practice law. Nevertheless, she regularly assisted her husband in the preparation of his cases. Sawyer once commented  about the status of women in the legal profession at the time:

Sawyer wrote many literary works throughout her life — ranging from newspaper correspondences, addresses, speeches, essays and fictions.

Works
The Legal Profession for Women (1893)
Is Farming a Realized Alchemy? (1893)
What Becomes of the Girl Graduates (1895)
The New Woman (1895)
Gingerbread (1902)
Parkour House Rolls (1901)
Mrs. Shimer's Life and Work (1901)
Lewis and Clark: The Story of their Expedition (1923)

Death
Sawyer died on October 24, 1939, at Lincoln, Lancaster County, Nebraska. She was buried at Wyuka Cemetery.

References

American women non-fiction writers
American feminist writers
Writers from New York (state)
1847 births
1939 deaths
19th-century American non-fiction writers
19th-century American women writers
20th-century American non-fiction writers
20th-century American women writers
People from Williamsville, New York
Shimer College alumni
Shimer College faculty
University of Nebraska alumni
American women academics